Candy Girl is the debut album of New Edition, released by Streetwise Records on July 19, 1983. The album was produced by Maurice Starr and Arthur Baker.

Production and conception 
New Edition was created by Bobby Brown after a failed talent show due to his stage fright. Bobby put the group together by adding Ricky Bell and Michael Bivins. With need for an additional singer, Ralph Tresvant was added in 1978. The name 'New Edition' was given to them by Brooke Payne, choreographer and uncle of Ronnie DeVoe who decided the group would be better choreographed with five members so he added Ronnie, but only after proving he was able to make the cut. Maurice Starr wrote and produced the title song seeing New Edition perform at a talent show. He signed them and had them record "Candy Girl" in a small studio in Roxbury, Massachusetts in 1982. By the time the title song "Candy Girl" was released, the group had hit their stride, so much so that Kurtis Blow, a rather popular rapper at that time, served as their opening act. The band members were between the ages of 14 and 16 when the song was released.

Release and promotion
The lead single of the album, Candy Girl, while being a massive hit on Black radio stateside and overseas, struggled for consistent plays on Pop radio and the video failed to crack the rotation at MTV in the U.S. despite strong sales numbers and being No. 1 on the Black Singles charts, surpassing George Clinton's "Atomic Dog" and Michael Jackson's "Billie Jean" while staving off "Beat It" on May 14th, 1983, spending 18 straight weeks on Billboard's Black Singles charts. "Candy Girl" was released on July 19th, 1983 and was a Top Black Album Pick by Billboard in the July 23rd, 1983 issue. "Candy Girl" first entered Billboard's Black LPs chart at #44 the week of August 13th, 1983 Although New Edition's "Candy Girl" album spent 43 straight weeks on Billboard's Black LPs chart and 33 straight weeks on the Billboard 200 beginning on September 23rd, 1983 with a peak position of #90, neither the hit single "Candy Girl" nor the LP "Candy Girl" received RIAA Gold or Platinum certification due to questionable accounting practices. Disputes over sales and revenue generated by the "Candy Girl" single and album led to New Edition's family seeking representation to sue their label Streetwise Records and wrest control of the group from Bostonian songwriter/producers Maurice Starr, Michael Jonzun and Arthur Baker. |

In the UK, the album was released on September 23, 1983.

Track listing 
All songs written by Maurice Starr and Michael Jonzun, except where noted.

Notes
  signifies a co-producer

Personnel
Arthur Baker – executive producer, producer, mixer, Roland and Linn drums, sound effects
Maurice Starr – producer, arrangement, mixer, bass guitar, lead guitar, synthesizer, Fender Rhodes, acoustic piano, drums, vocoder
Paul McCraven – executive producer
Michael Jonzun – co-arrangement, producer
Fred Torchio – recording
James Mace – recording
Frank Heller – engineer, mix engineer, tambourine
Bobby Brown – lead and backing vocals
Michael Bivins – lead and backing vocals
Ralph Tresvant – lead and backing vocals
Ricky Bell – lead and backing vocals
Ronnie DeVoe – lead and backing vocals
Tina B. – additional vocals
Bashiri Johnson – percussion
Jimmy Johnson Jr. – percussion
Gordon Worthy – keyboards

Charts

Weekly charts

References

New Edition "Candy Girl" CD Liner Notes.  1983, Streetwise/Warlock Records.

1983 debut albums
Albums produced by Maurice Starr
Albums produced by Arthur Baker (musician)
Albums produced by Michael Jonzun
New Edition albums